Punarjani Guha is a 150-metre natural tunnel in a rocky cliff situated in Thiruvilwamala in Thrissur District of Kerala state in southern India.

Ritual
The ritual can be practised only on Ekadasi and that also on the eleventh day of every lunar fortnight. The day is called Guruvayur Ekadasi or Vrischika Ekadasi day, in the Malayalam month of Vrishchikam. First the devotee has to take bath in the Papanasini Theertham, a water source near the cliff. It is believed that performing noozhal or crawling through the tunnel from one end to the other will wash away all the sins and thus allow one to attain Moksha, or freedom from rebirth.

References

Landforms of Kerala
Tunnels in India
Natural arches
Rock formations of India
Prehistoric India
History of Kerala
History of Thrissur district
Caves of Kerala
Tourist attractions in Thrissur district